Torneträsk or Torne träsk (Finnish and  or ) is a lake in Kiruna Municipality, Lapland, Norrbotten County in Sweden, in the Scandinavian Mountains. Träsk is the local word for lake (in Standard Swedish it means "swamp"). The lake drains to the south-east through Torne river. South-west of the lake lies the Abisko National Park and the UNESCO World Heritage Site Laponian area.

It is usually ice-covered from December through June, with variations dependent on temperature variations.

Permafrost is common in the land around the lake. This low elevation permafrost is disappearing because of global warming and increased snowfall.

During the 1944 Operation Obviate of WWII, British bombers seeking to destroy the German battleship Tirpiz had their rendezvous over Torneträsk, in violation of Swedish neutrality.

References

External links 

Kiruna
Torne river basin
Biosphere reserves of Sweden
Lakes of Norrbotten County